The women's balance beam competition at the 2018 Asian Games took place on the 21st and 24 August 2018 at the Jakarta International Expo Hall D2.

Schedule
All times are Western Indonesia Time (UTC+07:00)

Results

Qualification

Final

References

External links
Results

Artistic Women's balance beam